Phra Sing is a tambon (subdistrict) of Mueang Chiang Mai District, in Chiang Mai Province, Thailand. In 2005 it had a population of 8,616 people.

References

Tambon of Chiang Mai province
Populated places in Chiang Mai province